Edward J. Keyes (January 29, 1859 – May 10, 1929) was an American farmer and politician.

Born in the town of Lyndon, Sheboygan County, Wisconsin. Keyes was a farmer, in the town of Lyndon, and owned a cheese factory. He also worked for the I. L. Wood Barbed Wire Fence Manufacturing Company and worked on a farm for two years in DeKalb, Illinois. Keyes served as chairman of the Lyndon Town Board and was a Republican. He served in the Wisconsin State Assembly in 1907 and 1909. Keyes died near Plymouth, Wisconsin after a long illness.

References

1859 births
1929 deaths
People from DeKalb, Illinois
People from Lyndon, Sheboygan County, Wisconsin
Businesspeople from Wisconsin
Farmers from Illinois
Farmers from Wisconsin
Mayors of places in Wisconsin
Republican Party members of the Wisconsin State Assembly